William Hull Ellis (September 17, 1867 – April 14, 1948), more commonly referred to as William H. Ellis and W. H. Ellis, was an American attorney and politician from the state of Florida. Ellis served twice as the Chief Justice of the Supreme Court of Florida.

Early life and education 
Ellis was born in Pensacola, Florida on September 17, 1867, though he grew up in Quincy, Florida. After attending a business college in Atlanta, Georgia, Ellis attended Stetson University, graduating with his Juris Doctor in 1889. He was admitted to the Florida Bar in the same year. He began a private law practice in Quincy.

Ellis was one of Florida's delegates at the 1900 Democratic National Convention.

Political career

Early career 
In February 1903, Ellis helped reorganize Florida's Office of the Expert Accountant into the Office of the Florida State Auditor. In return, Florida Governor William Sherman Jennings appointed him as to the position. Ellis served as the state's auditor until February 15, 1904, when he was appointed as the 18th Florida Attorney General by Jennings, finishing the term of James B. Whitfield, who had been appointed to the Supreme Court of Florida.

Ellis was elected to his first full term later in 1904. While serving as attorney general, Ellis, a Progressive, contributed in the reorganization of the Florida Bar, transforming the organization from a simple benefit society to an active group of lawyers, publishing a legal journal and drafting court procedures.

Ellis did not seek reelection in 1908, opting instead to return to private practice. From 1911 until 1915, he served as the general counsel of Florida's Internal Improvement Fund.

Supreme Court of Florida 
On January 5, 1915, Governor Park Trammell appointed Ellis to the Supreme Court of Florida. Ellis served a long and distinguished career on the court, with his dissenting opinion for State v. Daniel (1924) foreshadowing what would become gender equality, writing:    
While on the court, Ellis served as the President of the Florida Bar from 1919 until 1920. In 1926, the Florida Constitution was amended to allow the justices to elect their own chief justice. In January 1927, Ellis became the first chief justice elected in this way, "because he was the member with the most seniority who had not yet served in that capacity". He served as the court's Chief Justice twice, from 1927 until 1929 and from 1937 until he retired from the court due to illness on November 1, 1938.

In 1935, Ellis delivered a speech titled The Spirit of Americanism to the Civitan Club of Jacksonville, Florida. Since the speech occurred on Confederate Memorial Day, Ellis invoked references to Robert E. Lee to stoke the flames against what he saw was the overreach of the federal government during the Great Depression, breaking with the progressive views of President Franklin D. Roosevelt in favor of the ideals of states rights, which would eventually turn into the Dixiecrat Party.

Death and legacy 
Ellis died on April 14, 1948 in Jacksonville. He is buried in Quincy's Eastern Cemetery.

In January 2018, Ellis' granddaughter, Martha Ellis Holcomb, and her daughter Catherine Berry, donated many of his possessions to the Florida Supreme Court Historical Society, including his 100-page personal memoir.

Personal life 
In 1894, Ellis married Minnie Ramelle Nicholson. They were married until her death in childbirth for their second son, Melville Hull, in 1902. In 1906, Ellis married Serena Taylor, the daughter of Florida Supreme Court Justice R. Fenwick Taylor. They had two children, twin daughters Julia Taylor and Amelia Fenwick, and were married until Ellis' death.

Ellis was a member of the Freemasons and the Knights of Pythias, as well as Pi Gamma Mu and Phi Alpha Delta.

References 

1867 births
1948 deaths
American judges
Florida Attorneys General
People from Pensacola, Florida
People from Quincy, Florida
Stetson University College of Law alumni
Stetson University alumni
Florida Democrats
Progressive Era in the United States
Justices of the Florida Supreme Court
Gender equality
States' rights
American Freemasons
20th-century American politicians
Chief Justices of the Florida Supreme Court